Batrachorhina simillima is a species of beetle in the family Cerambycidae. It was described by Stephan von Breuning in 1948. It is known from Madagascar.

References

Batrachorhina
Beetles described in 1948